The Hotel in Chicago (German:Das Gasthaus von Chicago) is a 1921 German silent film directed by Bruno Eichgrün.

Cast
In alphabetical order
 Pietro Bruce as Jimmy, der Wirt  
 Bruno Eichgrün as Nic Carter  
 Erwin Fichtner 
 Richard Georg as Mr. John Cutter  
 Kurt Katch as Manuele  
 Gerhard Ritterband as Bobby  
 Grete Weixler as Schöne Anita

References

Bibliography
 Rea Brändle. Nayo Bruce: Geschichte einer afrikanischen Familie in Europa. Sautter, 2007.

External links

1920 films
Films of the Weimar Republic
Films directed by Bruno Eichgrün
German silent feature films
German black-and-white films
Nick Carter (literary character)